James Neill may refer to:

 James Neill (actor) (1860–1931), American actor
 James George Smith Neill (1810–1857), Scottish military officer of the East India Company
 James C. Neill (1788–1848), American soldier and politician
 James Kerby Neill (1906–1996), professor of English
 Sir James Hugh Neill (1921–2017), British businessman, public servant, and British Army officer

See also  
 James Neil (born 1968), American rower
 James Neal (disambiguation)
 James O'Neill (disambiguation)